The Hobbs Islands are a group of islands  northeast of William Scoresby Bay, Antarctica. The largest island of this group was discovered on 18 February 1931 by the British Australian New Zealand Antarctic Research Expedition under Mawson who thought it to be a cape and called it "Cape Hobbs" for Professor William H. Hobbs. Later exploration by the William Scoresby expedition (1936) and the Lars Christensen Expedition (1936–37) showed it to be part of an island group.

See also 
 List of Antarctic and sub-Antarctic islands

References

 Islands of Mac. Robertson Land